Curt Joel Söderlund (born 2 September 1945) is a former Swedish road racing cyclist who won the Tour du Maroc in 1968. He also won the individual national title in 1964, 1968, 1970 and 1973, placing third in 1969. Söderlund finished fifth at the 1967 UCI Road World Championships and 51st at the 1968 Olympics.

References

1945 births
Living people
Swedish male cyclists
Olympic cyclists of Sweden
Cyclists at the 1968 Summer Olympics
Sportspeople from Stockholm